The Tilburgs Dierenpark was a zoo at the Bredaseweg in Tilburg, Netherlands.

History
The park opened its doors in 1932 as a wedding present from Johan Burgers (the founder of Royal Burgers' Zoo) to his daughter and her husband from Tilburg. In 1946 the park was sold to C. van Dijk & Sons who helped to develop the park as well. The park was closed in 1973.

Attractions (incomplete)
Donkeys
Flamingos
Giraffes
Polar bears
Camels
Common crane
Lions
Elephants
Parrots
Penguins
Rhesus macaque
Tiger
Penguins
Seals

Show
In 2008 a few museums from Tilburg organized an exposition together with writer Nicole van Dijk. As a part of this project a book was published "Het Tilburgs dierenpark, een familiegeschiedenis" (The Tilbury zoo, a family history).

References

External links
CuBra
Tilburg Dierenpark

Zoos in the Netherlands
Buildings and structures in Tilburg
Articles needing infobox zoo